The 1912–13 Toronto Hockey Club season was the first season of the Toronto franchise in the National Hockey Association (NHA). The team was also known as the Blueshirts.

Team business
Operation of the ice-making equipment at the new Arena Gardens was delayed a week when the pipes had to be relaid. Local pipefitters, unfamiliar with ice-making equipment, had  installed the pipes improperly, and W. H. Magee of New York, advisor to the Arena, ordered the pipes removed and reinstalled.

Off-season
The Torontos' manager Bruce Ridpath built the team from new prospects, rather than signing established professionals, like the Tecumsehs, the other Toronto NHA club. Ridpath signed Scotty Davidson, who had been playing in Calgary; Frank Foyston of the Toronto Eatons, Roy McGiffin of the Simcoes, Cully Wilson of Winnipeg, and Harry Cameron and Frank Nighbor of Port Arthur. Only Archie McLean from the PCHA had previous big-league experience.

Regular season

Cully Wilson scored the first-ever goal for the Torontos, in their opening night 9–5 loss to the Canadiens. The team started the season poorly under the coaching of Ridpath, but Ridpath signed Jack Marshall, the former star of the Montreal Wanderers as coach. The team continued to struggle until Marshall decided to become a playing coach with the team. His veteran presence helped the Blueshirts to win some games, eventually finishing third in the standings.

Nighbor was the scoring star for the Blueshirts, scoring 23 goals.

Final standings

Schedule and results

Source: Coleman 1966

Player stats

Source: Society for International Hockey Research (SIHR)

See also
 1912–13 NHA season

References
 

Notes

Toronto Blueshirts seasons
Toronto Hockey Club season, 1912-13